Methods of Silence is the second album by the German band Camouflage, released by Atlantic Records in June 1989. The single "Love is a Shield" reached position 9 of the German single charts making it Camouflage's most successful song and at position 20 in the American Billboard Modern Rock Tracks.

Background
Camouflage set up a new studio, "Boys Factory 2", near their home town before entering the Synsound Studio in Brussels in early 1989. The producer, Dan Lacksman (known for his work with Telex), used both modern and old technology to create the new album. The band was given more creative freedom due to their previous success.

Chart performance
The album reached #13 in the German Album Charts. The first single, "Love Is a Shield" was also a hit, reaching #9 in the Singles Chart, and has become one of the band's best-known songs.

Professional reviews
A review by Allmusic wrote that the album's "material contrasted sharply with the vibrancy of the ensuing decade" referring to the decline of the Synthpop genre at the beginning of the 1990s. The albums was however noted for its sonic precision and a reliance on pop-song structures.

Track listing

Personnel
Camouflage
Heiko Maile - vocals, programming, moorsuphon
Marcus Meyn - vocals, programming
Oliver Kreyssig - vocals, programming, rhythm

Additional personnel
Dan Lacksman, Georges Alexander Van Dam, Ingo Ito, James Herter, Jean-Michel Alexandre, Michael Moers, Simone Winter, Thomas Dorr, Caroline, Jean-Paul Dessy, Johannes Luley, Patrick Dussart de la Iglesia.

References

External links
Official discography

1989 albums
Camouflage (band) albums